Dichanthium aristatum is a species of grass in the family Poaceae. It is commonly used as a forage for livestock.
Common names include angleton grass (Australia, Cuba); alabang X (Philippines); angleton blue-stem,  yellow bluestem (United States); wildergrass (Hawai'i); hierba.

References

External links
 
 

Andropogoneae